The 2006 Big Sky men's basketball tournament was held March 4–8, with the final two rounds at the Walkup Skydome in Flagstaff, Arizona, home of regular season champion .

Second-seeded Montana defeated host Northern Arizona in the championship game,  to win their sixth Big Sky tournament title.

Format
Conference membership remained at eight. Similar to the previous year, the top six teams in the regular season conference standings participated in the tournament. The top two earned byes into the semifinals while the remaining four played in the quarterfinals, which were played on Saturday at the home court of the higher seed. The lowest remaining seed met the top seed in the semifinals on Tuesday.

Bracket

NCAA tournament
Montana earned the automatic bid to the NCAA tournament, and no other Big Sky members were invited. Seeded twelfth in the Minneapolis regional (Midwest), the Grizzlies upset Nevada in the first round at Salt Lake City. They were stopped in the next round by Boston College.

The Big Sky has had a berth in the NCAA tournament since 1968, and Montana was the conference's ninth and most recent team to advance.

Northern Arizona was invited to the 40-team NIT, but lost in the first round to Delaware State.

References

Tournament
Big Sky Conference men's basketball tournament, 2006
Big Sky Conference men's basketball tournament
Big Sky Conference men's basketball tournament
College basketball tournaments in Arizona
Flagstaff, Arizona